Bjørn Trygve Grydeland (born 30 May 1949) is a Norwegian civil servant and diplomat.

He graduated as cand.polit. from the University of Oslo in 1979. He was deputy under-secretary of State in the Office of the Prime Minister from 1988 to 1992, and secretary-general there from 1992 to 2001. From 2001 to 2005 he was the Norwegian ambassador to the European Union in Brussels. From 2006 to 2007 he was a president in the European Free Trade Association Surveillance Authority, before returning to Norway as permanent under-secretary of State of the Ministry of Foreign Affairs. From 2011 to 2017 he served as the Norwegian ambassador to Italy.

In 2008 he was proclaimed Commander with Star of the Order of St. Olav. He resides at Ballerud.

References

1949 births
Living people
People from Molde
University of Oslo alumni
Norwegian civil servants
Ambassadors of Norway to the European Union
Ambassadors of Norway to Italy